Blage Kiprijanovski was a Mayor of Kumanovo Municipality in Macedonia.

See also
 Mayor of Kumanovo
 List of Mayors of Kumanovo
 Kumanovo Municipality
 Kumanovo shootings
 Timeline of Kumanovo

References

 

Mayors of Kumanovo
1948 births
Living people